The Party of Mauritanian Authenticity (PAM) is a political party in Mauritania. It is led by Mohamed Mahmoud El Gharachi.

History
The party won one seat in the 2013 parliamentary elections.

References

Political parties in Mauritania